D2 motorway may refer to:

 D2 motorway (Slovakia)
 D2 motorway (Czech Republic)